William Daniel Mayer (born October 30, 1941), was a member of the Maryland House of Delegates for District 28, which covers Charles County, MD.

Background
Delegate Mayer was appointed to District 28 in 2005 by former Maryland Governor Bob Ehrlich to replace W. Louis Hennessy, who was appointed to District Court of Maryland, District 4, Charles County.  Hennessy was appointed to the position in 2003 to replace Thomas E. Hutchins, who was appointed to Secretary of Veteran Affairs.

Education
Delegate Mayer attended La Plata High School.  After high school he graduated from Charles Community College, where he received his Associates of Arts Degree in 1962. Later her returned to college, this time the University of Maryland College Park, where he received his bachelor's degree of Arts in Business in 1972.

Career
Mayer served in the United States Army Reserves from 1964 until 1970.  After college, Mayer worked for the Nabisco Company as a sales representative until 1997.  Mayer also began working as an associate broker for Baldus Real Estate  in 1972, where he continues to work.

Mayer is also active in many civic organizations.  He was the Chair of the March of Dimes Campaign for 2002, 2003, and 2004.  He was president of the Charles County Chamber of Commerce  and has been active in the Knights of Columbus since 1965.  Mr. Mayer is also active in the Charles County Farm Bureau , the American Legion Post no. 82., Meals on Wheels, Hospice Festival of Trees, and the Red Cross Summer Classic (Charles County). He is a past member of the College of Southern Maryland Foundation .

In the legislature
During Delegate Mayer's brief period in the Maryland House of Delegates, he served on the Judiciary Committee and was a member of the Maryland Rural Caucus and the Maryland Veterans Caucus.

Election results
2006 Race for Maryland House of Delegates – District 28
Voters to choose three:
{| class="wikitable"
|-
!Name
!Votes
!Percent
!Outcome
|-
|-
|Sally Y. Jameson, Dem.
|24,051
|  24.5%
|   Won
|-
|-
|Murray Levy, Dem.
|23,436
|  23.9%
|   Won
|-
|-
|Peter Murphy, Dem.
|21,190
|  21.6%
|   Won
|-
|-
|William Daniel Mayer, Rep.
|15,978
|  16.3%
|   Lost
|-
|-
|James H. Crawford, Rep.
|13,343
|  13.6%
|   Lost
|-
|Other Write-Ins
|135
|  0.1%
|   Lost
|-
|}

References and notes

External links
 http://www.msa.md.gov/msa/mdmanual/06hse/former/html/msa14375.html
 https://www.washingtonpost.com/wp-srv/metro/elections/2006/maryland/candidates/William_Daniel_Mayer.html

1941 births
Living people
People from La Plata, Maryland
Republican Party members of the Maryland House of Delegates